The name Fran was used for four tropical cyclones in the Atlantic Ocean.
 Hurricane Fran (1973) – formed and remained out at sea.
 Tropical Storm Fran (1984) – formed close enough to Cape Verde to cause tropical storm-force winds there, but otherwise threatened no land.
 Tropical Storm Fran (1990) – formed near Cape Verde; it passed between Trinidad and Venezuela, losing strength rapidly and causing no significant damage.
 Hurricane Fran (1996) – made landfall near Cape Fear, North Carolina as a Category 3, killing 26 and causing $3.2 billion in damages.

The name Fran was retired after the 1996 season, and was replaced by Fay in the 2002 season.

The name Fran was also used for nine tropical cyclones in the Western Pacific:
 Typhoon Fran (1950) (T5043)
 Typhoon Fran (1955) (T5511)
 Tropical Depression Fran (1959) (13W, Japan Meteorological Agency analyzed it as a tropical depression, not as a tropical storm.)
 Tropical Storm Fran (1962) (T6201, 02W)
 Tropical Storm Fran (1964) (T6425, 38W)
 Tropical Storm Fran (1967) (T6712, 14W)
 Tropical Storm Fran (1970) (T7015, 16W)
 Tropical Storm Fran (1973) (T7307, 07W, Kuring)
 Typhoon Fran (1976) (T7617, 17W) – hit southwestern Japan and caused heavy flooding and wind damage.

The name Fran was also used for one tropical cyclone in the Southwest Pacific:
 Cyclone Fran (1992)

Atlantic hurricane set index articles
Pacific typhoon set index articles
South Pacific cyclone set index articles